A moorish oven (hornos morunos in Spanish) is a traditional clay wood-fired oven.

Calera
Calera is a type of Moorish traditional oven for the manufacture of plaster. It is commonly used in Morocco and environs. During the Moorish period, the plaster produced was intended to erect walls on the humble homes of Madrid. Its use dates back to the early Middle Ages, and the popularity of plaster as a building material caused the demand to surge so much that more than hundred Moorish ovens were built within the Madrid community. The demand for plaster was local so all of the ovens are located near the historic centers of Madrid municipalities.

The name comes from the use made during the Al-Andalus era of Aljezares in the production of plaster. These furnaces were in production until mid-century.

See also 
 Wood-fired oven

External links

References

Ovens
Clay
Plastering